The 2013 All-Big 12 Conference football team consists of American football players chosen as All-Big 12 Conference players for the 2013 Big 12 Conference football season.  The conference recognizes two official All-Big 12 selectors: (1) the Big 12 conference coaches selected separate offensive and defensive units and named first- and second-team players (the "Coaches" team); and (2) a panel of sports writers and broadcasters covering the Big 12 also selected offensive and defensive units and named first- and second-team players (the "Media" team).

Offensive selections

Quarterbacks
 Bryce Petty, Baylor (Coaches-1; Media-1)
 Clint Chelf, Oklahoma State (Coaches-2; Media-2)

Running backs
 Lache Seastrunk, Baylor (Coaches-1; Media-1)
 Charles Sims, West Virginia (Coaches-1; Media-2)
 James Sims, Kansas (Coaches-2; Media-1)
 Malcolm Brown, Texas (Coaches-2)

Fullbacks
 Trey Millard, Oklahoma (Coaches-1)
 Kye Staley, Oklahoma State (Coaches-2)

Centers
 Gabe Ikard, Oklahoma (Coaches-1; Media-1)
 B. J. Finney, Kansas State (Coaches-1; Media-2)

Guards
 Cyril Richardson, Baylor (Coaches-1; Media-1)
 Trey Hopkins, Texas (Coaches-2; Media-1)
 Quinton Spain, West Virginia (Media-2)
 Cody Whitehair, Kansas State (Coaches-2)

Tackles
 Parker Graham, Oklahoma State (Coaches-1; Media-1)
 Le'Raven Clark, Texas Tech (Coaches-2; Media-1)
 Spencer Drango, Baylor (Coaches-1; Media-2)
 Donald Hawkins, Texas (Coaches-2; Media-2)
 Cornelius Lucas, Kansas State (Media-2)
 Daryl Williams, Oklahoma (Coaches-2)

Tight ends
 Jace Amaro, Texas Tech (Coaches-1; Media-1)
 E. J. Bibbs, Iowa State (Coaches-2; Media-2)

Receivers
 Antwan Goodley, Baylor (Coaches-1; Media-1)
 Tyler Lockett, Kansas State (Coaches-1; Media-1)
 Tevin Reese, Baylor (Coaches-1; Media-2)
 Mike Davis, Texas (Media-2)
 Jalen Saunders, Oklahoma (Coaches-2)
 Jaxon Shipley, Texas (Coaches-2)
 Josh Stewart, Oklahoma State (Coaches-2)
 Eric Ward, Texas Tech (Media-2)

Defensive selections

Defensive linemen
 Calvin Barnett, Oklahoma State (Coaches-1; Media-1)
 Jackson Jeffcoat, Texas (Coaches-1; Media-1)
 Ryan Mueller, Kansas State (Coaches-1; Media-1)
 Cedric Reed, Texas (Coaches-2; Media-1)
 Chris McAllister, Baylor (Coaches-1; Media-2)
 Charles Tapper, Oklahoma (Coaches-1; Media-2)
 Will Clarke, West Virginia (Coaches-2; Media-2)
 Kerry Hyder, Texas Tech (Coaches-2; Media-2)
 Tyler Johnson, Oklahoma State (Coaches-2)
 Chucky Hunter, TCU (Coaches-2)

Linebackers
 Jeremiah George, Iowa State (Coaches-1; Media-1)
 Eddie Lackey, Baylor (Coaches-1; Media-1)
 Caleb Lavey, Oklahoma St (Coaches-2; Media-1)
 Shaun Lewis, Oklahoma State (Coaches-1; Media-2)
 Will Smith, Texas Tech (Media-1)
 Ben Heeney, Kansas (Coaches-2; Media-2)
 Bryce Hager, Baylor (Media-2)
 Blake Slaughter, Kansas State (Media-2)
 Eric Striker, Oklahoma (Coaches-2)

Defensive backs
 Aaron Colvin, Oklahoma (Coaches-1; Media-1)
 Justin Gilbert, Oklahoma State (Coaches-1; Media-1)
 Jason Verrett, TCU (Coaches-1; Media-1)
 Ty Zimmerman, Kansas State (Coaches-1; Media-1)
 Ahmad Dixon, Baylor (Coaches-1; Media-2)
 Sam Carter, TCU (Coaches-2; Media-2)
 Daytawion Lowe, Oklahoma State (Coaches-2; Media-2)
 Carrington Byndom, Texas (Coaches-2)
 Darwin Cook, West Virginia (Coaches-2)
 Chris Hackett, TCU (Media-2)
 Jacques Washington, Iowa State (Coaches-2)

Special teams

Kickers
 Anthony Fera, Texas (Coaches-1; Media-1)
 Mike Hunnicutt, Oklahoma (Coaches-2; Media-2)

Punters
 Spencer Roth, Baylor (Coaches-1; Media-1)
 Nick O'Toole, West Virginia (Coaches-2; Media-2)
 Kirby Van Der Kamp, Iowa State (Coaches-2)

All-purpose / Return specialists
 Tyler Lockett, Kansas State (Coaches-1; Media-1)
 Charles Sims, West Virginia (Media-2)
 Josh Stewart, Oklahoma State (Coaches-2)

Key
Bold = selected as a first-team player by both the coaches and media panel

Coaches = selected by Big 12 Conference coaches

Media = selected by a media panel

See also
2013 College Football All-America Team

References

All-Big 12 Conference
All-Big 12 Conference football teams